Paris Saint-Germain F.C. is a French professional association football club based in Paris.

Paris Saint-Germain may also refer to:
Paris Saint-Germain Féminines, a French women's professional association football club and the female section of Paris Saint-Germain F.C.
Paris Saint-Germain Academy, the youth system of Paris Saint-Germain F.C.
Paris Saint-Germain Handball, a French professional handball club and the handball section of Paris Saint-Germain F.C.
Paris Saint-Germain eSports, a French professional eSports club and the eSports section of Paris Saint-Germain F.C.
Paris Saint-Germain Rugby League, a defunct French professional rugby league club and formerly the rugby league section of Paris Saint-Germain F.C.
Paris Saint-Germain Boxing, a defunct French professional boxing club and formerly the boxing section of Paris Saint-Germain F.C.
Paris Saint-Germain Judo, a French professional judo club and the judo section of Paris Saint-Germain F.C.